Silene zawadzkii is a species of flowering plant in the family Caryophyllaceae.

The species is native Ukraine and Romania.

References

zawadzkii